Microlepidogaster discus is a species of armored catfish endemic to the Rio Jequitinhonha in southeastern Brazil.

References

Otothyrinae
Catfish of South America
Fish of Brazil
Endemic fauna of Brazil
Taxa named by Fernanda de Oliveira Martins
Taxa named by Alaina Cristine Rosa
Taxa named by Francisco Langeani-Neto
Fish described in 2014